The 6th Golden Satellite Awards were given on January 19, 2002, at the St. Regis Hotel in Los Angeles, California.

Special achievement awards
Mary Pickford Award (for outstanding contribution to the entertainment industry) – Karl Malden

Special Achievement Award (for outstanding devotion & commitment in promoting the best of Israeli films through Israel Film Festival in the United States) – Meir Fenigstein

Outstanding New Talent – Dakota Fanning / Rupert Grint

Motion picture winners and nominees

Best Actor – Drama
 Brian Cox – L.I.E.
Russell Crowe – A Beautiful Mind
Guy Pearce – Memento
Sean Penn – I Am Sam
Billy Bob Thornton – Monster's Ball
Denzel Washington – Training Day

Best Actor – Musical or Comedy
 Ewan McGregor – Moulin Rouge!
Colin Firth – Bridget Jones's Diary
Gene Hackman –The Royal Tenenbaums
John Cameron Mitchell – Hedwig and the Angry Inch
Ben Stiller – Zoolander
Chris Tucker – Rush Hour 2

Best Actress – Drama
 Sissy Spacek – In the Bedroom
Halle Berry – Monster's Ball
Cate Blanchett – Charlotte Gray
Judi Dench – Iris
Nicole Kidman – The Others
Tilda Swinton – The Deep End

Best Actress – Musical or Comedy
 Nicole Kidman – Moulin Rouge!
Thora Birch – Ghost World
Audrey Tautou – Amélie (La fabuleux destin d'Amélie Poulain)
Sigourney Weaver – Heartbreakers
Reese Witherspoon – Legally Blonde
Renée Zellweger – Bridget Jones's Diary

Best Animated or Mixed Media Film
 The Lord of the Rings: The Fellowship of the Ring
 Harry Potter and the Philosopher's Stone
 Jimmy Neutron: Boy Genius
 Monsters, Inc.
 Shrek

Best Art Direction
 Moulin Rouge!
Gosford Park
Harry Potter and the Philosopher's Stone
The Lord of the Rings: The Fellowship of the Ring
The Others

Best Cinematography
 The Man Who Wasn't There – Roger Deakins
Hearts in Atlantis
The Lord of the Rings: The Fellowship of the Ring
Moulin Rouge!
Pearl Harbor

Best Costume Design
 Moulin Rouge! – Catherine Martin and Angus Strathie
The Affair of the Necklace
From Hell
The Lord of the Rings: The Fellowship of the Ring
Planet of the Apes

Best Director
 Baz Luhrmann – Moulin Rouge!
Jonathan Glazer – Sexy Beast
John Cameron Mitchell – Hedwig and the Angry Inch
Christopher Nolan – Memento
Scott McGehee and David Siegel – The Deep End

Best Documentary Film
 In Cane for Life (A Vida em Cana)
Calle 54
My Voyage to Italy (Il mio viaggio in Italia)
Stanley Kubrick: A Life in Pictures

Best Editing
 The Lord of the Rings: The Fellowship of the Ring – John Gilbert
Amélie (Le fabuleux destin d'Amélie Poulain)
A Beautiful Mind
Harry Potter and the Philosopher's Stone
Moulin Rouge!

Best Film – Drama
 In the Bedroom
The Deep End
Memento
The Others
Sexy Beast

Best Film – Musical or Comedy
 Moulin Rouge!
Bridget Jones's Diary
Gosford Park
Hedwig and the Angry Inch
The Royal Tenenbaums

Best Foreign Language Film
 No Man's Land, Bosnia-Herzegovina
Amélie (Le fabuleux destin d'Amélie Poulain), France
Baran, Iran
Beijing Bicycle (Shiqi sui de dan che), China/France/Taiwan
Our Lady of the Assassins (La virgen de los sicarios), Colombia/France/Spain
The Princess and the Warrior (Der Krieger und die Kaiserin), Germany

Best Original Score
 "Moulin Rouge!" – Craig Armstrong
"A Beautiful Mind" – James Horner
"Hannibal" – Hans Zimmer
"Legally Blonde" – Rolfe Kent
"Spy Game" – Harry Gregson-Williams

Best Original Song
 "All Love Can Be" performed by Charlotte Church – A Beautiful Mind
"Come What May" – Moulin Rouge!
"There You'll Be" – Pearl Harbor
"Vanilla Sky" – Vanilla Sky
"I Fall Apart" – Vanilla Sky

Best Screenplay – Adapted
 In the Bedroom – Robert Festinger and Todd Field
A Beautiful Mind – Akiva Goldsman
Hedwig and the Angry Inch – John Cameron Mitchell
Last Orders – Fred Schepisi
The Lord of the Rings: The Fellowship of the Ring – Philippa Boyens, Peter Jackson and Fran Walsh

Best Screenplay – Original
 Monster's Ball – Milo Addica and Will Rokos
Memento – Christopher Nolan
Moulin Rouge! – Baz Luhrmann and Craig Pierce
The Others – Alejandro Amenábar
Sexy Beast – Louis Mellis and David Scinto

Best Sound
 The Lord of the Rings: The Fellowship of the Ring
Hedwig and the Angry Inch
Jurassic Park III
Moulin Rouge!
The Others

Best Supporting Actor – Drama
 Ben Kingsley – Sexy Beast
Jim Broadbent – Iris
Billy Crudup – Charlotte Gray
Ed Harris – A Beautiful Mind
Ian McKellen – The Lord of the Rings: The Fellowship of the Ring
Goran Visnjic – The Deep End

Best Supporting Actor – Musical or Comedy
 Jim Broadbent – Moulin Rouge!
Steve Buscemi – Ghost World
Hugh Grant – Bridget Jones's Diary
Carl Reiner – Ocean's Eleven
Ben Stiller – The Royal Tenenbaums
Owen Wilson – The Royal Tenenbaums

Best Supporting Actress – Drama
 Jennifer Connelly – A Beautiful Mind
Fionnula Flanagan – The Others
Brittany Murphy – Don't Say a Word
Julia Stiles – The Business of Strangers
Marisa Tomei – In the Bedroom
Kate Winslet – Iris

Best Supporting Actress – Musical or Comedy
 Maggie Smith – Gosford Park
Anjelica Huston – The Royal Tenenbaums
Helen Mirren – Gosford Park
Gwyneth Paltrow – The Royal Tenenbaums
Miriam Shor – Hedwig and the Angry Inch
Emily Watson – Gosford Park

Best Visual Effects
 The Lord of the Rings: The Fellowship of the Ring
Harry Potter and the Philosopher's Stone
Jurassic Park III
Moulin Rouge!
Pearl Harbor

Outstanding Motion Picture Ensemble
Gosford Park

Television winners and nominees

Best Actor – Drama Series
 Kiefer Sutherland – 24
James Gandolfini – The Sopranos
Craig T. Nelson – The District
William Petersen – CSI: Crime Scene Investigation
Martin Sheen – The West Wing

Best Actor – Musical or Comedy Series
 Kelsey Grammer – Frasier
Thomas Cavanagh – Ed
Eric McCormack – Will & Grace
Ray Romano – Everybody Loves Raymond
George Segal – Just Shoot Me!

Best Actor – Miniseries or TV Film
 Richard Dreyfuss – The Day Reagan Was Shot
William Hurt – Varian's War
Ben Kingsley – Anne Frank: The Whole Story
Damian Lewis – Band of Brothers
Jeffrey Wright – Boycott

Best Actress – Drama Series
 Edie Falco – The Sopranos
Amy Brenneman – Judging Amy
Kim Delaney – Philly
Marg Helgenberger – CSI: Crime Scene Investigation
Sela Ward – Once and Again

Best Actress – Musical or Comedy Series
 Debra Messing – Will & Grace
Jenna Elfman – Dharma & Greg
Lauren Graham – Gilmore Girls
Jane Kaczmarek – Malcolm in the Middle
Lisa Kudrow – Friends

Best Actress – Miniseries or TV Film
 Judy Davis – Life with Judy Garland: Me and My Shadows
Laura Linney – Wild Iris
Sissy Spacek – Midwives
Hannah Taylor-Gordon – Anne Frank: The Whole Story
Emma Thompson – Wit

Best Miniseries
 Life with Judy Garland: Me and My Shadows
Anne Frank: The Whole Story
Band of Brothers
Further Tales of the City
Uprising

Best Series – Drama
 24
The District
Six Feet Under
The Sopranos
The West Wing

Best Series – Musical or Comedy
 Sex and the City
Dharma & Greg
Everybody Loves Raymond
Frasier
Friends

Best Supporting Actor – (Mini)Series or TV Film
 David Schwimmer – Band of Brothers
Billy Campbell – Further Tales of the City
Cary Elwes – Uprising
Colin Firth – Conspiracy
Stanley Tucci – Conspiracy

Best Supporting Actress – (Mini)Series or TV Film
 Julia Ormond – Varian's War
Tammy Blanchard – Life with Judy Garland: Me and My Shadows
Brenda Blethyn – Anne Frank: The Whole Story
Jill Hennessy – Jackie, Ethel, Joan: The Women of Camelot
Lauren Holly – Jackie, Ethel, Joan: The Women of Camelot

Best TV Film
 The Day Reagan Was Shot
Conspiracy
Midwives
Varian's War
Wild Iris
Wit

Outstanding Television Ensemble
Buffy the Vampire Slayer

New Media winners and nominees

Best Internet Site
www.bmwfilms.com
www.cbs.com/latenight/lateshow
www.cinemanow.com
www.heavy.com
www.sputnik7.com

Computer Software
Final Cut Pro 2.0
Avid Xpress DV
Final Draft 5.0
Macromedia Flash 5.0
Premiere 6.0

Video Game
Final Fantasy VIII
Command & Conquer: Red Alert 2
Myst, Riven: The Sequel to Myst, and Myst III: Exile (for the Myst series)
Quake III Arena
Tony Hawk's Pro Skater 2

Awards breakdown

Film
Winners:
9 / 14 Moulin Rouge!: Best Actor & Actress & Film & Supporting Actor – Musical or Comedy / Best Art Direction & Costume Design & Director / Best Original Score
4 / 9 The Lord of the Rings: The Fellowship of the Ring: Best Animated or Mixed Media Film / Best Editing & Sound / Best Visual Effects
3 / 4 In the Bedroom: Best Actress & Film – Drama / Best Screenplay – Adapted
2 / 6 Gosford Park: Best Supporting Actress – Musical or Comedy / Outstanding Motion Picture Ensemble
2 / 7 A Beautiful Mind: Best Original Song / Best Supporting Actress – Drama
1 / 1 In Cane for Life (A Vida em Cana): Best Documentary Film
1 / 1 L.I.E.: Best Actor – Drama
1 / 1 No Man's Land: Best Foreign Language Film
1 / 1 The Man Who Wasn't There: Best Cinematography
1 / 3 Monster's Ball: Best Screenplay – Original
1 / 4 Sexy Beast: Best Supporting Actor – Drama

Losers:
0 / 6 Hedwig and the Angry Inch, The Others, The Royal Tenenbaums
0 / 4 Bridget Jones's Diary, The Deep End, Memento
0 / 3 Amélie (La fabuleux destin d'Amélie Poulain), Iris, Harry Potter and the Philosopher's Stone, Pearl Harbor
0 / 2 Charlotte Gray, Ghost World, Jurassic Park III, Legally Blonde, Vanilla Sky

Television
Winners:
2 / 2 24: Best Actor – Drama Series / Best Series – Drama
2 / 2 The Day Reagan Was Shot: Best Actor – Miniseries or TV Film / Best TV Film
1 / 1 Buffy the Vampire Slayer: Outstanding Television Ensemble
1 / 1 Sex and the City: Best Series – Musical or Comedy
1 / 2 Frasier: Best Actor – Musical or Comedy Series
1 / 2 Will & Grace: Best Actress – Musical or Comedy Series
1 / 3 Band of Brothers: Best Supporting Actor – (Mini)Series or TV Film
1 / 3 The Sopranos: Best Actress – Drama Series
1 / 3 Varian's War: Best Supporting Actress – (Mini)Series or TV Film

Losers:
0 / 4 Anne Frank: The Whole Story
0 / 3 Conspiracy
0 / 2 CSI: Crime Scene Investigation, Dharma & Greg, The District, Everybody Loves Raymond, Friends, Further Tales of the City, Jackie, Ethel, Joan: The Women of Camelot, Midwives, Uprising, The West Wing, Wild Iris, Wit

References

External links
2002 6th Annual SATELLITE™ Awards Nominees and Winners

Satellite Awards ceremonies
2001 awards
2001 film awards
2001 television awards